American Industries is a large real estate development company based in Chihuahua, Mexico. They also have offices in Monterrey, Ciudad Juárez, and El Paso.

It provides various industrial real estate services, including built-to-suit, sale-lease-back, shared leases programs, and warehousing.

References

Companies based in Chihuahua (state)